Paula Moseley is a British racing cyclist and triathlete, specialising in cross country and marathon mountain bike racing, and was the master women's national cross country champion in 2007.

Palmarès

2005
1st Overall, XC National Points Series
1st XC National Points Series, Round 4, Margam Park - Expert
3rd XC National Points Series, Round 5, Sherwood - Expert

2006
1st  XC, British National Mountain Biking Championships - Master
3rd Marathon, British National Mountain Biking Championships

2007
7th Trek Marathon Series, Round 1, Sherwood

2008
3rd Marathon, British National Mountain Biking Championships, Margam Park
3rd XC National Points Series, Round 1, Thetford

References

Year of birth missing (living people)
Living people
British female cyclists
Marathon mountain bikers
Cross-country mountain bikers
British female triathletes
Place of birth missing (living people)
21st-century British women